María Teresa de Larraín y Guzmán Peralta (March 2, 1785 - 1828) was First Lady of Chile and the wife of President Agustín Eyzaguirre. She was of Basque descent.

She was born in Santiago, the daughter of Agustín de Larraín y Lecaros and of Ana Josefa de Guzmán Peralta y Lecaros. With her husband, they had ten children together.

Additional information

See also
First Ladies of Chile

References

External links
Genealogical chart of Eyzaguirre-Larraín family

1785 births
1828 deaths
Chilean people of Basque descent
People from Santiago
First ladies of Chile
19th-century Chilean people
Teresa